Forgotten or The Forgotten may refer to:

Film 
 Forgotten (1933 film), an American film directed by Richard Thorpe
 The Forgotten (1973 film), a psychological horror film
 The Forgotten (1989 film), a television action movie for the USA Network directed by James Keach
 The Forgotten (2003 film), a Korean War film
 The Forgotten (2004 film), a psychological thriller film
 Forgotten (2013 film), a 2013 Bolivian film
 The Forgotten (2014 film), a British horror film
 Forgotten (2017 film), 2017 South Korean mystery thriller film

Literature 
 The Forgotten (Applegate novel), a book in the Animorphs series by K. A. Applegate
 The Forgotten (Baldacci novel), 2012 novel by David Baldacci
 The Forgotten (Wiesel novel), 1992 novel by Elie Wiesel

Television 
 The Forgotten (TV series), an American crime drama
 "The Forgotten" (Batman: The Animated Series), an episode
 "The Forgotten" (Star Trek: Enterprise), an episode
 Forgotten (2012 film), a Taiwanese/Chinese television film

Music 
 The Forgotten (band), a punk rock band
 "The Forgotten" (Green Day song), a song by American punk rock band Green Day from their 2012 album ¡Tré!
 "Forgotten", a song by Avail from Satiate
 "Forgotten", a song by Avril Lavigne from Under My Skin
 "The Forgotten (Part One)" and "The Forgotten (Part Two)", songs by Joe Satriani from Flying in a Blue Dream
 "The Forgotten", a song by Killswitch Engage from Killswitch Engage (2009 album)
 "Forgotten", a song by Korn from Requiem
 "Forgotten", a song by Linkin Park from Hybrid Theory

Video games 
 Age of Empires II: The Forgotten, an expansion pack

Places 

 Forgotten River, New Zealand
 Forgotten Hills, Victoria Land, Antarctica

See also
 Bolesław the Forgotten ( before 1016–1038 or 1039), a semi-legendary Duke of Poland
 Forgetting
 Forgotten One (disambiguation)
 Forgotten war (disambiguation)

fi:Unohdetut